Christian Schwarz-Schilling (born 19 November 1930) is an Austrian-born German politician, entrepreneur, philanthropist and media and telecommunications innovator who served as High Representative for Bosnia and Herzegovina from 1 February 2006 until 30 June 2007 and as the 2nd European Union Special Representative for Bosnia and Herzegovina during the same period. He was born in Innsbruck, the son of the composer Reinhard Schwarz-Schilling and is married to the author Marie-Luise Schwarz-Schilling with whom he has two children.

Professional career
In 1950, Schwarz-Schilling got his Abitur at the Ernst-Moritz-Arndt Gymnasium in Berlin. He continued to study History and East Asian Languages and Culture at the Ludwig Maximilian University in Munich. In 1956 he was granted a Ph.D. for his thesis on Chinese History, "Der Friede von Shan-Yüan 1005 n. Chr. und seine Auswirkungen auf die Beziehungen zwischen dem Chinesischen Reich und dem Liao-Reich der Kitan" (The Peace of Shan Yuan 1005 AD, and its Effects on the Relations between the Chinese Empire and the Liao-Empire of Kitan).

In 1957, he became manager of the battery manufacturer Accumulatorenfabrik Sonnenschein in Büdingen in Hesse, which he remained until 1982. 1993-2002 he was CEO of Dr. Schwarz-Schilling & Partner GmbH, his own telecommunications consultancy in Büdingen.

In 1971, he became a member of the Television Council of the ZDF, one of Germany's two public service TV stations, which he left in 1982. Between 1975 and 1983 he was chairman of the coordination council for Media Politics of the CDU/CSU.

Political career
During this period he began to form an interest in regional politics, joining the Christian Democratic Union in 1960. In 1964, he joined the regional board of the CDU in Hesse. In 1966, Schwarz-Schilling was elected into the regional parliament of Hesse and in 1967 he became the general secretary of the CDU in Hesse. Since 1971, Schwarz-Schilling became involved in national politics, becoming member of several councils. In 1976 Schwarz-Schilling was elected into the Bundestag and remained a member until 2002. During this time he served as the vice-chairman of the Small Business Union of the CDU/CSU between 1977 and 1997. In 1979, he became president of the Executive Bureau of the European Small Business Union, which he left in 1982. Between 1981 and 1982, he was  chairperson of the Research Committee on New Information and Communication Technology of the Bundestag furthering innovative communications technology.

In 1982, he was appointed Federal Minister for Post and Communication, in the first Kohl cabinet. Before his appointment, he was  He retained his post for the next three cabinets Kohl, Schwarz-Schilling was never part of Kohl's inner circle and is, by some, regarded as unremarkable minister. Others see him as cabinet minister who pursued a long-term strategy of modernisation and actually got things done. Under his ministry cable television was introduced in Germany and commercial television was allowed to broadcast. Deutsche Post was privatised, including its Telecom business. Schwarz-Schilling also introduced GSM nationwide. He was instrumental in pushing the GSM-project of France, Germany and Italy forward both technically and politically.  He was responsible for letting the UK become part of it. This culminated in the Bonn declaration of 1987. By the time he left office, Germany had one of the most modern communications infrastructures in the world.

In 1992, Schwarz-Schilling resigned his post in anger at Germany's inaction over atrocities in the then Yugoslavia — rebuffing Chancellor Kohl's protestations that Germany's post-war constitution barred it from stepping in. He told the Chancellor he was "ashamed" to belong to such a government, saying he had entered politics in the first place to ensure that atrocities like those perpetrated by the Nazis "never happen again." The Munich daily Sueddeutsche Zeitung later commented that "most notable act in office was leaving it".

As Yugoslavia lurched into chaos, Schwarz-Schilling began to try to mediate between the factions — a role later formalised in the Washington agreement of 1994, and which he held until 2004.

During and after the war, Schwarz-Schilling travelled around the country, trying to resolve disputes and later overseeing the return of some of the 2.2 million refugees — half the population — created by the conflict. .

In 1995, he became chairperson of the sub-committee on Human Rights and Humanitarian Aid. In 1998 the sub-committee became a full committee and Schwarz-Schilling became its vice-chairperson, serving until 2002.

Critics
To speed up the cable project, Schwarz-Schilling decided to involve private companies in the cable laying. Sonnenschein KG also had its wife's company involved in the "Projektgesellschaft für Kabel-Kommunikation mbH", where he had been managing director for many years. His shares on the Sonnenschein KG, he resigned only a few hours before his appointment as Postminister. Buyer of these shares was the Nixdorf Group. His decision to use copper, met both at home and abroad to wonder: It was already foreseen in the early 1980s that fiber optic cables are the "technology of the future."

During his tenure, Black Schilling was known as "Kohl's most affair rich minister". The trigger for these affairs were usually the complications of his wife's family business in Schwarz-Schilling's political decisions.

Among the employees of the Deutsche Bundespost Schwarz-Schilling was anything but popular, as he was the last Postminister before privatization. So there was a joke among the staff: What does Schwarz-Schilling do when he comes to the office in the morning? He does the post.

International political career

On 14 December 2005 he was confirmed to replace Lord Ashdown both as the High Representative (OHR) — a post created by the 1995 Dayton Agreement — and as the EU's special representative in Bosnia and Herzegovina. On 31 January 2006 he was appointed as such. Schwarz-Schilling was nominated by the Bosniak and Bosnian Serb presidents. He has cast his role as that of "advisor" to the country who wants to "listen to the people" — in contrast to his predecessor Ashdown, who attracted criticism particularly from Bosnian Serbs for relying too heavily on his Bonn-powers to force through legislation and sack elected officials.

Under Schwarz-Schilling, the OHR seemed to soften its invasiveness, thanks to pressures from the Council of Europe and a growing EU involvement. The number of OHR legislative initiatives and of dismissed officials lowered. The EU decision to shut down the OHR by June 2007 unexpectedly arose disappointment and concern in the Bosnian population, NGOs, and politicians. During his time in office, nationwide research by Oxford Research International, which Schwarz-Schilling oversaw, showed that the silent majority of Bosnia and Herzegovina was significantly more tolerant and forward-looking than the politicians who represented them. It also showed that several policies implemented by national politicians and the international community were out of step with what the population wanted.

Slovak diplomat Miroslav Lajčák replaced Christian Schwarz-Schilling - who was originally intended to be the last holder of the post - on 30 June 2007.
Lajčák retook a more intrusive approach in the work of the OHR, making it seem that apparently decreased intrusiveness was mostly due to the "weak personality" of Schwarz-Schilling. However, Schwarz-Schilling remains popular with the Bosnian population.

Trivia
In 1992, Schwarz-Schilling received the Achievement Cross with Star of the Order of Achievement of the Federal Republic of Germany
In 1995, he became Honorary Doctor of Business Administration of the Bryant College in Smithfield, USA.
In 2004, he was made an honorary citizen of the town Büdingen
In 2005, he received the Manfred Wörner Medal for "special meritorious service to peace and freedom in Europe".
In 2007, he received the Hessian Peace Prize for his efforts to end the atrocities in Bosnia and Herzegovina during and after the war.
 Since 2007, Schwarz-Schilling has been teaching as a professor at Sarajevo School of Science and Technology

References

1930 births
Living people
Government ministers of Germany
Members of the Bundestag for Hesse
Members of the Bundestag 1998–2002
Members of the Bundestag 1994–1998
Members of the Bundestag 1990–1994
Politicians from Innsbruck
High Representatives for Bosnia and Herzegovina
Knights Commander of the Order of Merit of the Federal Republic of Germany
Members of the Landtag of Hesse
German people of Jewish descent
German officials of the European Union
Members of the Bundestag for the Christian Democratic Union of Germany
Businesspeople from Innsbruck
Academic staff of the Sarajevo School of Science and Technology